Smilja is a South Slavic feminine given name.

Notable people with the name include:

 Smilja Avramov (1918–2018), Serbian legal scholar and activist
 Smilja Marjanović-Dušanić (born 1963), Serbian historian
 Smilja Mučibabić (1912–2006), Bosnian Serb biologist
 Smilja Tišma (born c. 1929), Serbian politician
 Smilja Vujosevic (1935–2016), Canadian chess player of Serbian origin

See also
 Smiljan (given name)

Serbian feminine given names